The 2018–19 Montreal Canadiens season was the 110th season for the franchise that was founded on December 4, 1909, and their 102nd in the National Hockey League. Despite a strong effort, the Canadiens failed to qualify for the playoffs, marking the first time that the team missed back-to-back postseasons since the 2000–01 season. Finishing the season with 96 points, the Canadiens also tied the record for most points by a non-qualifying NHL team, joining the 2014–15 Boston Bruins and the 2017–18 Florida Panthers.

Standings

Schedule and results

Preseason
The preseason schedule was published on June 18, 2018.

Regular season
The regular season schedule was released on June 21, 2018.

Player statistics
As of April 6, 2019

Skaters

Goaltenders

†Denotes player spent time with another team before joining the Canadiens. Stats reflect time with the Canadiens only.
‡Denotes player was traded mid-season. Stats reflect time with the Canadiens only.
Bold/italics denotes franchise record.

Awards and honours

Milestones

Transactions
The Canadiens have been involved in the following transactions during the 2018–19 season.

Trades

Free agents

Waivers

Contract terminations

Retirement

Signings

Draft picks

Below are the Montreal Canadiens' selections at the 2018 NHL Entry Draft, which was held on June 22 and 23, 2018, at the American Airlines Center in Dallas, Texas.

Notes:
 The Chicago Blackhawks' second-round pick went to the Montreal Canadiens as the result of a trade on February 26, 2016, that sent Tomas Fleischmann and Dale Weise to Chicago in exchange for Phillip Danault and this pick.
 The Toronto Maple Leafs' second-round pick went to the Montreal Canadiens as the result of a trade on February 25, 2018, that sent Tomas Plekanec and Kyle Baun to Toronto in exchange for Kerby Rychel, Rinat Valiev and this pick.
 The Edmonton Oilers' third-round pick went to the Montreal Canadiens as the result of a trade on June 23, 2018, that sent Washington's second-round pick in 2018 (62nd overall) to Edmonton in exchange for a fifth-round pick in 2018 (133rd overall) and this pick.
 The Montreal Canadiens' fourth-round pick was re-acquired as the result of a trade on November 23, 2017, that sent Torrey Mitchell to the Los Angeles Kings in exchange for this pick (being conditional at the time of the trade).
 The Vegas Golden Knights' fourth-round pick went to the Montreal Canadiens as the result of a trade on June 23, 2018, that sent Edmonton's fourth-round pick in 2018 (102nd overall) to San Jose in exchange for Florida's fifth-round pick in 2018 (139th overall) and this pick.
 The Edmonton Oilers' fifth-round pick went to the Montreal Canadiens as the result of a trade on June 23, 2018, that sent Washington's second-round pick in 2018 (62nd overall) to Edmonton in exchange for a third-round pick in 2018 (71st overall) and this pick.
 The Montreal Canadiens' seventh-round pick was re-acquired as the result of a trade on June 23, 2018, that sent a seventh-round pick in 2019 to Philadelphia in exchange for this pick.

References

Montreal Canadiens seasons
Montreal Canadiens
Canadiens
2010s in Montreal
2018 in Quebec
2019 in Quebec